1977 Emperor's Cup Final was the 57th final of the Emperor's Cup competition. The final was played at National Stadium in Tokyo on January 1, 1978. Fujita Industries won the championship.

Overview
Fujita Industries won their 1st title, by defeating Yanmar Diesel 4–1.

Match details

See also
1977 Emperor's Cup

References

Emperor's Cup
1977 in Japanese football
Shonan Bellmare matches
Cerezo Osaka matches